Nativity of Mary, Blessed Virgin Catholic Church is a historic church located at 2833 Farm to Market Road 2672 in High Hill, Texas. The church, which was built in 1906, was designed by prominent Texas church architect Leo M.J. Dielmann. Dielmann designed the red brick church in the Gothic Revival style. The interior of the church was painted by Ferdinand Stockert and Hermann Kern in 1912. The pair painted designs on canvas and affixed them to the church walls, resulting in decorations which resemble wallpaper. The designs were drawn freehand and include symbols such as angels, crosses with crowns, Stars of David, and bunches of grapes.
The church was added to the National Register of Historic Places in 1983.

See also

National Register of Historic Places listings in Fayette County, Texas

References

External links

Roman Catholic churches in Texas
Churches on the National Register of Historic Places in Texas
Gothic Revival church buildings in Texas
Roman Catholic churches completed in 1906
Churches in Fayette County, Texas
National Register of Historic Places in Fayette County, Texas
1906 establishments in Texas
20th-century Roman Catholic church buildings in the United States